Matilde Serao (7 March 1856 – 25 July 1927) was an Italian journalist and novelist. She was the first woman called to edit an Italian newspaper, Il Corriere di Roma and later Il Giorno. Serao was also the co-founder and editor of the newspaper Il Mattino, and the author of several novels. She never won the Nobel Prize in Literature despite being nominated on six occasions.

Biography
Serao was born in the Greek city of Patras to an Italian father, Francesco Serao, and a Greek mother, Paolina Borely (or Bonelly). Her father had emigrated to Greece from Naples for political reasons.

In 1860 the family moved back to Italy, first to Carinola and then to Naples. Serao grew up in poverty and worked as a schoolmistress, an experience later described in the preface to a book of short stories called Leggende Napolitane (Napoletan Legends, 1881). She first gained notoriety after publishing her short stories in Il Piccolo, a newspaper edited by Rocco de Zerbi and her first novel, Fantasia (Fantasy, 1883), which established her as an author capable of writing with sentiment and analytical subtleties.

She spent the years between 1880 and 1886 in Rome, where she wrote her next five volumes of short stories and novels, all dealing with the struggles of ordinary people, and distinguished by great accuracy of observation and depth of insight: Cuore infermo (1881), Fior di passione (1883), La conquista di Roma (1885), La Virtù di checchina (1884), and Piccole anime (1883).

With her husband, Edoardo Scarfoglio, she founded Il Corriere di Roma, the first Italian attempt to model a daily journal along the lines of the Parisian press. The paper was short lived, and after its demise Serao established herself in Naples where she edited Il Corriere di Napoli. In 1892 she co-founded Il Mattino with her husband, which became the most important and most widely read daily paper of southern Italy. She established and ran her own newspaper, "Il Giorno" in 1904 until her death. The stress of a journalistic career in no way limited her literary activity; between 1890 and 1902 she produced Il paese di cuccagna, Il ventre di Napoli, Addio amore, All'erta sentinella, Castigo, La ballerina, Suor Giovanna della Croce, Paese di Gesù, novels in which the character of the people is rendered with sensitive power and sympathetic breadth of spirit. Most of these have been translated into English. The late nineteenth century English novelist George Gissing read three of her works in the original Italian between November 1894 and early January 1895, namely "Gli Amanti", "Cuore Infermo" and "Fantasia".

Serao was a signatory of the 1925 Manifesto of the Anti-Fascist Intellectuals. She was one of the contributors of the Fascist women's magazine, Lidel.

She died in 1927 in Naples.

Works in English translation
 Fantasy (1890)
 Farewell Love (1890)
 The Ballet Dancer and On Guard (1901)
 In the Country of Jesus (1901)
 The Land of Cockayne (1901)
 The Conquest of Rome (1902)
 After the Pardon (1909)
 The Desire of Life (1911)
 Souls Divided (1919)
 The Severed Hand (1925)
 The Harvest (1928)
 Heart Conditions (2018)

References

Further reading
 Gisolfi, Anthony M. (1967). "The Dramatic Element in Matilde Serao's Little Masterpieces," Italica, Vol. 44, No. 4, pp. 433–445.
 Gisolfi, Anthony M. (1968). The Essential Matilde Serao. New York: Las Americas Publishing Company.
 James, Henry (1914). "Matilde Serao." In: Notes on Novelists. New York: Charles Scribner's Sons, pp. 294–313.
 Kennard, Joseph Spencer (1906). "Matilde Serao." In: Italian Romance Writers. New York: Brentano's, pp. 273–301.
 Russo, Teresa G. (1997). "Matilde Serao: A True Verista for the Female Character," International Social Science Review, Vol. 72, No. 3/4, pp. 122–135.

Sources

External links

 Matilde Serao at the Women Film Pioneers Project
 
 
 

1856 births
1927 deaths
Writers from Patras
Italian people of Greek descent
Italian women journalists
20th-century Italian novelists
19th-century Neapolitan people
Italian newspaper editors
Italian women editors
Women film pioneers
Manifesto of the Anti-Fascist Intellectuals
Italian anti-fascists
Women newspaper editors
20th-century Italian women writers
19th-century Italian women writers